Ibarra is a town and municipality located in the province of Gipuzkoa, in the autonomous community of Basque Country, northern Spain. By 2003 INE figures Ibarra had a total population of 4,374.

References

External links
 Official Website  and Basque.
 IBARRA in the Bernardo Estornés Lasa - Auñamendi Encyclopedia (Euskomedia Fundazioa) 

Municipalities in Gipuzkoa